Nose fetishism, nose partialism, or nasophilia is the partialism (or paraphilia) for the nose. This may include the sexual attraction to a specific form of physical variation of appearance (such as shape and size), or a specific area (for example; the bridge or nostrils). The fetish may manifest itself in a desire for actual physical contact and interaction, or specific fantasies such as the desire to penetrate the nostrils with a penis or with a finger (comparable with fingering). Nose fetishism can also include the desire to ejaculate into the nostrils or onto the nose. 
Some people with this fetish masturbate while looking at someone with a nose they find extremely attractive. Some people with this fetish also enjoy pinching someone's nose so that they open their mouths to breathe. 

Other fantasies may include the desire to observe or experience a transformation of a nose with reference to an element of a fictional work such as Pinocchio, or ideas concerning the transformation of the nose into that of another creature's like a pig's snout as a means of sexually humiliating a partner or acquaintance. These fantasies may be assisted with use of props, role-play or transformation fiction, in the form of writing, artwork, or modified photographs of people (known as morphing).

Sigmund Freud interpreted the nose as a substitute for the penis.

References

Sources
 Russ Kick, "Everything You Know about Sex Is Wrong: The Disinformation Guide to the Extremes of Human Sexuality (and Everything in Between)", The Disinformation Company, 2005, 
 Brenda Love, "The Encyclopedia of Unusual Sex Practices", Barricade Books, 1994,  (Online)

Further reading 
 Anil Aggrawal, "Forensic and Medico-Legal Aspects of Sexual Crimes and Unusual Sexual Practices", CRC Press, 2008, p. 110,377
 Eric W. Hickey, "Sex crimes and paraphilia", Pearson Education, 2006, p. 83
 Ronald M. Holmes, Stephen T. Holmes, "Sex crimes: patterns and behavior", Sage Publications, 2001, p. 246
 Viren Swami, Adrian Furnham, The psychology of physical attraction, Routledge, 2008, p. 134

Sexual fetishism
Paraphilias
Fetishism